Lamazière-Basse is a commune in the Corrèze department in central France.

Geography
The Vianon forms most of the commune's eastern and southeastern boundaries, then flows into the Luzège, which forms most of the commune's western and southwestern boundaries.

Population

See also
Communes of the Corrèze department

References

Communes of Corrèze